Rached Arfaoui (born 7 March 1996) is a Tunisian football midfielder who currently plays for Tunisian Ligue Professionnelle 1 club Espérance de Tunis. He was a squad member for the 2013 FIFA U-17 World Cup.

References

External links

1996 births
Living people
Tunisian footballers
Club Africain players
Olympique Béja players
AS Soliman players
Association football midfielders
Tunisian Ligue Professionnelle 1 players
Tunisia youth international footballers
Espérance Sportive de Tunis players